Selmier State Forest was established through a donation to the Indiana Department of Natural Resources by Mrs. Frank Selmier, on behalf of her husband Frank.  Due to Frank's interest in the outdoors, he planted black locust, pine, black walnut, tulip-tree, and sycamore on many acres from the years of 1921 to 1934.  The forest includes six short trails.  

The park does not offer any amenities such as public restrooms, camp sites, or boat ramps. Both fishing and hunting are available however.

References

External links
Selmier State Forest Official website

Indiana state forests
Protected areas of Jennings County, Indiana
Protected areas established in 1927